Udagama Pahala Yamanelegedera Jinadasa (born 26 November 1911) was a Ceylonese politician. He was the member of Parliament of Sri Lanka from Kundasale representing the Sri Lanka Freedom Party. He was defeated in the 1965 general election and the 1977 general election.

References

Members of the 4th Parliament of Ceylon
Members of the 5th Parliament of Ceylon
Members of the 7th Parliament of Ceylon
Sri Lanka Freedom Party politicians
1911 births

Date of death missing
Year of death missing